Galin Ivanov (born 15 April 1988) is a Bulgarian professional footballer, who plays as an attacking midfielder for Slavia Sofia.

His former clubs include Beroe Stara Zagora, Slavia Sofia, Levski Sofia and Arminia Bielefeld.

Career
In June 2014, Ivanov signed for Azerbaijan Premier League side FK Khazar Lankaran. In February 2015, he became part of the Samsunspor team in Turkey on a one-and-a-half-year contract.

In September 2016, Ivanov joined Levski Sofia, signing a short-term contract which was not renewed.

On 12 February 2017, Ivanov signed with Neftochimic Burgas.

On 18 August 2017, Ivanov returned to Slavia Sofia, signing a short-term contract.

After spending two years with CSKA 1948, he once again returned to Slavia Sofia in the summer of 2022.

International career
Ivanov earned his first cap for the senior national football team of his country on 3 June 2016, after coming on as a second-half substitute for Mihail Aleksandrov in the 2:7 loss against Japan in a semi-final of the 2016 Kirin Cup.

International goals
Scores and results list Bulgaria's goal tally first.

Career statistics

Club

Honours
Slavia Sofia
 Bulgarian Cup (1): 2017–18

References

External links
 
 
 Profile at LevskiSofia.info

1988 births
Living people
Bulgarian footballers
Bulgaria youth international footballers
Bulgaria under-21 international footballers
Bulgaria international footballers
Association football midfielders
PFC Levski Sofia players
PFC Beroe Stara Zagora players
PFC Slavia Sofia players
Arminia Bielefeld players
PFC Litex Lovech players
Khazar Lankaran FK players
Samsunspor footballers
Neftochimic Burgas players
Szombathelyi Haladás footballers
FC CSKA 1948 Sofia players
First Professional Football League (Bulgaria) players
2. Bundesliga players
Azerbaijan Premier League players
TFF First League players
Nemzeti Bajnokság I players
Bulgarian expatriate footballers
Bulgarian expatriate sportspeople in Germany
Bulgarian expatriate sportspeople in Azerbaijan
Bulgarian expatriate sportspeople in Turkey
Bulgarian expatriate sportspeople in Hungary
Expatriate footballers in Germany
Expatriate footballers in Azerbaijan
Expatriate footballers in Turkey
Expatriate footballers in Hungary
People from Kazanlak